Makoto Sei Watanabe (born 1952) is a Japanese architect living in Tokyo. He designed such buildings as Japan's K Museum, has lectured at universities around Japan, and won many awards for his designs. He is the author of The Induction Cities, published in 2002.

History
Makoto Sei Watanabe was born in Yokohama, Japan. He studied architecture at the Yokohama National University and graduated in 1976. He worked under Arata Isozaki in Tokyo until starting his own firm, the Makoto Sei Watanabe Architectural Office, in 1984.

Watanabe's designs are characterized by a modern approach, using computers and mathematical algorithms to generate his styles. He writes about this type of style in The Induction Cities, published in 2002. He is also the subject of Makoto Sei Watanabe: Conceiving the City, published by l'Arca Edizioni in 1999. Most recently, he published a book in 2009 titled Algorithmic Design, which further explores his computerized method of designing structures.

Buildings

1990 - Aoyama Technical College, Aoyama, Tokyo
1995 - Mura-No-Terrace, Gifu, Japan
1996 - K-Museum, Tokyo
2000 - Iidabashi Station, Tokyo
2004 - Shin-Minamata Station, Minamata
2004 - Shanghai House, Shanghai, China
2005 - Kashiwanoha-campus Station, Tsukuba
2005 - Kashiwa-Tanaka Station, Kashiwa
2005 - Tokyo House, Tokyo
2005 - Ribbon
2008 - DoMain Office Building, T'ai-Tung, Taiwan
2009 - RibbonS Outdoor Theater, Taichung, Taiwan

Awards
1997 - ASLA Professional Award
2001 - Gold Prize of Good Design Award
2002 - AIJ Prize

References

External links

 Makoto Sei Watanabe Architects
 Collection of FRAC Centre (Regional Fund of Contemporary Art of Center)

Japanese architects
1952 births
Living people
Yokohama National University alumni